Pablo Martín Melitón de Sarasate y Navascués (10 March 1844 – 20 September 1908), commonly known as Pablo de Sarasate, was a Spanish (Navarrese) violin virtuoso, composer and conductor of the Romantic period. His best known works include Zigeunerweisen (Gypsy Airs), the Spanish Dances, and the Carmen Fantasy.

Biography

Sarasate was born in Pamplona, Navarre in 1844, the son of Don Miguel Sarasate, a local artillery bandmaster. Apparently, after seeing his father struggle with a passage for a long time, he picked up the violin and played it perfectly. He began studying the violin with his father at the age of five and later took lessons from a local teacher. His musical talent became evident early on and he appeared in his first public concert in A Coruña at the age of eight.

His performance was well-received, and caught the attention of a wealthy patron who provided the funding for Sarasate to study under Manuel Rodríguez Saez in Madrid, where he gained the favor of Queen Isabella II. Later, as his abilities developed, his parents decided to send him to study under Jean-Delphin Alard at the Paris Conservatoire at the age of twelve. Aboard the train en route to Paris, his mother (who accompanied him) died of a heart attack at the Spanish-French border, and Sarasate was found to be suffering from cholera. The Spanish consul in Bayonne took Sarasate to his home and nursed him back to health, then financed his trip to Paris.

There, Sarasate auditioned successfully for Alard, who arranged for him to live with his colleague Théodore de Lassabathie, administrator of the Conservatoire. At seventeen, Sarasate entered a competition for the Premier Prix and won his first prize, the Conservatoire's highest honor. (No other Spanish violinist achieved this until Manuel Quiroga did so in 1911; Quiroga was frequently compared to Sarasate throughout his career.)

Sarasate, who had been publicly performing since childhood, made his Paris debut as a concert violinist in 1860, and played in London the following year. Over the course of his career, he toured many parts of the world, performing in Europe, North America, and South America. His artistic pre-eminence was due principally to the purity of his tone, which was free from any tendency towards the sentimental or rhapsodic, and to that impressive facility of execution that made him a virtuoso. In his early career, Sarasate performed mainly opera fantasies, most notably the Carmen Fantasy, and various other pieces that he had composed. The popularity of Sarasate's Spanish flavour in his compositions is reflected in the work of his contemporaries. For example, the influences of Spanish music can be heard in such notable works as Édouard Lalo's Symphonie espagnole which was dedicated to Sarasate; Georges Bizet's Carmen; and Camille Saint-Saëns' Introduction and Rondo Capriccioso, written expressly for Sarasate and dedicated to him.

Of Sarasate's idiomatic writing for his instrument, the playwright and music critic George Bernard Shaw once declared that though there were many composers of music for the violin, there were but few composers of violin music. Of Sarasate's talents as performer and composer, Shaw said that he "left criticism gasping miles behind him". Sarasate's own compositions are mainly show-pieces designed to demonstrate his exemplary technique. Perhaps the best known of his works is Zigeunerweisen (1878), a work for violin and orchestra. Another piece, the Carmen Fantasy (1883), also for violin and orchestra, makes use of themes from Georges Bizet's opera Carmen. Probably his most performed encores are his four books of Spanish Dances, Opp. 21, 22, 23, 26, brief pieces designed to please the listener's ear and show off the performer's talent. He also made arrangements of a number of other composers' work for violin, and composed sets of variations on "potpourris" drawn from operas familiar to his audiences, such as his Fantasia on La forza del destino (his Opus 1), his "Souvenirs de Faust", or his variations on themes from Die Zauberflöte.

At Brussels, he met Berthe Marx, who traveled with him as soloist and accompanist on his tours through Europe, Mexico, and the US; playing in about 600 concerts. She also arranged Sarasate's Spanish Dances for the piano. In 1904, he made a small number of recordings. In all his travels Sarasate returned to Pamplona each year for the San Fermín festival.

Sarasate died in Biarritz, France, on 20 September 1908, from chronic bronchitis. He bequeathed his violin, made by Antonio Stradivari in 1724, to the Musée de la Musique. The violin now bears his name as the Sarasate Stradivarius in his memory. His second Stradivari violin, the Boissier of 1713, is now owned by Real Conservatorio Superior de Música, Madrid. Among his violin pupils was Alfred de Sève. The Pablo Sarasate International Violin Competition is held in Pamplona.

A number of works for violin were dedicated to Sarasate, including Henryk Wieniawski's Violin Concerto No. 2, Édouard Lalo's Symphonie espagnole, Camille Saint-Saëns' Violin Concerto No. 3 and his Introduction and Rondo Capriccioso, Max Bruch's Scottish Fantasy, and Alexander Mackenzie's Pibroch Suite. Also inspired by Sarasate is William H. Potstock's Souvenir de Sarasate.

Appearance in other art forms
 James Whistler's Arrangement in Black: Pablo de Sarasate (1884) is a portrait of Pablo Sarasate.
In Arthur Conan Doyle's short story The Red-Headed League (1891), Sherlock Holmes and Dr. John H. Watson attend a concert by Sarasate. Violinist Bruce Dukov portrays Sarasate in the 1984 Granada Television adaptation of the story.
Sarasate is a major figure in Murder to Music, a Sherlock Holmes pastiche by Anthony Burgess.  Holmes is also mentioned as attending a Sarasate concert in The Treasure Train by Frankie Thomas.
In Edith Wharton's 1920 novel The Age of Innocence, set in 1870s New York, the main protagonist is invited to a private recital to be given by Sarasate.
 Zigeunerweisen is the title of Seijun Suzuki's 1980 movie, the first of the so-called Taisho Trilogy. A recording of the air of the same title by Sarasate, and his that can be heard on the recording, are one of the themes of the movie.
 He appears in Mercedes Lackey's Elemental Masters story A Study in Sable (based on the folk tale "The Twa Sisters"), as an Elemental Master of Spirit, able to conjure, speak with, and to some extent control ghosts with his music; he even goes so far as to use a bow made of the bone and hair of a murdered woman in an effort to bring her murderous sister to justice.

List of compositions

Sarasate composed more than fifty works, all of which include the violin. He assigned opus numbers to 54 of them.

References

Bibliography

Attribution

External links

 , and others (i.a. Jascha Heifetz and Itzhak Perlman)
 Pablo de Sarasate: Biography & list of works (in English and French)

 Eduardo H. Asiain plays music by Pablo Sarasate
 pablosarasate.com
 Pablo de Sarasate recordings at the Discography of American Historical Recordings.

1844 births
1908 deaths
19th-century classical composers
19th-century classical violinists
19th-century French male musicians
19th-century Spanish composers
19th-century Spanish male musicians
20th-century classical composers
20th-century classical violinists
20th-century French male musicians
20th-century Spanish composers
20th-century Spanish male musicians
Basque classical composers
Basque classical musicians
Composers for violin
Conservatoire de Paris alumni
Deaths from bronchitis
Honorary Members of the Royal Philharmonic Society
Male classical violinists
People from Pamplona
Pupils of Lambert Massart
Spanish classical composers
Spanish classical violinists
Spanish expatriates in France
Spanish male classical composers
Spanish Romantic composers